The Ormeau Bridge is a road bridge in Belfast, roughly 80m long, carrying the A24 Ormeau Road across the River Lagan from Stranmillis Embankment to Ormeau Embankment.

The bridge was opened in 1863 and designed by Charles Lanyon to a near-identical standard as his earlier Queen's Bridge. It replaced an earlier, less stable structure dating from 1809. At some point in the 20th century the bridge was widened to accommodate increased traffic, by the addition of cantilevered segments on either side.

At the junction with Annadale Embankment is a ghost bike.

See also
List of bridges over the River Lagan

References

Bridges in Northern Ireland
Transport in Belfast
Buildings and structures in Belfast